KIMB (1260 AM) was a radio station licensed to Kimball, Nebraska, United States. The station was last owned by Victor A. Michael, Jr., through licensee Laramie Mountain Broadcasting, L.L.C.

History
The Federal Communications Commission (FCC) granted a license to cover to KIMB Inc. on May 10, 1977. The license was later assigned to David S. Young, who in turn assigned it to G & L Investments, LLC on January 7, 2002 for $65,000. G & L assigned the license on a pro forma basis to Steckline Communications, L.L.C. on December 31, 2003 in exchange for a parcel of land. Steckline assigned the license to Legacy Communications, LLC on May 17, 2004 for $4.75 million — also included in the transaction were the licenses for KMMJ, KRGI, KRGI-FM, and KRGY. Legacy assigned the licenses for KIMB and KBFZ to Kimball Radio, LLC on April 4, 2007. On July 18, 2008, Kimball assigned the license to Sterling Radio, LLC for $50,000. Sterling assigned the license to Main Street Communications, LLC, on March 19, 2009. Main Street assigned the license to Victor A. Michael, Jr.'s Laramie Mountain Broadcasting, L.L.C. on September 13, 2012 in exchange for forgiveness of a $100,000 debt owed by Main Street.

On March 24, 2015, KIMB's license was deleted by the FCC at the request of Laramie Mountain Broadcasting. In the request (which had been made on March 23), the station said it ceased operations on March 21, 2014 due to technical problems, and had not resumed broadcasting within a year.

References

External links

IMB
Radio stations established in 1977
1977 establishments in Nebraska
Radio stations disestablished in 2015
2014 disestablishments in Nebraska
Defunct radio stations in the United States
Defunct mass media in Nebraska